The inaugural Critics' Choice Television Awards ceremony, presented by the Broadcast Television Journalists Association (BTJA), honored the best in primetime television programming from June 1, 2010, to May 31, 2011, and was held on June 20, 2011, at The Beverly Hilton in Los Angeles, California. The ceremony was live-streamed on VH1's website and was televised on ReelzChannel in an edited format two days after the ceremony occurred. Cat Deeley served as the host of the ceremony. The winners were announced on June 20, 2011. Danny DeVito received the Critics' Choice Television Icon Award.

Winners and nominees
Winners are listed first and highlighted in boldface:

Shows with multiple wins
The following shows received multiple awards:

Shows with multiple nominations
The following shows received multiple nominations:

References

2011 television awards
2011 in American television
 001
June 2011 events in the United States
2011 in Los Angeles